Alpine skiing at the 2016 Winter Youth Olympics was held at Hafjell in Øyer, Oppland, Norway from 14 to 20 January. The difference in the Youth Olympic program for alpine skiing compared to the Winter Olympics is that there was no downhill event for both genders, and an inclusion of a team event.

Medal summary

Medal table

Events

Boys' events

Girls' events

Mixed events

Qualification system
Each nation could send a maximum of 4 athletes (2 boys and 2 girls). A total of 115 athletes (60 boys and 55 girls) could compete, plus any reallocated spots from other disciplines under the FIS. The top 7 teams at the 2015 Junior Alpine World Ski Championships plus the hosts Norway were allowed to send the maximum of 4 athletes. Any remaining quota spots were distributed to nations not already qualified, with a maximum of one boy or girl from one nation. The quota limit was 115. The current allocation of quotas is listed below.

Qualification summary

References

External links
Results Book – Alpine skiing

 
2016 in alpine skiing
2016 Winter Youth Olympics events
2016
Youth Olympics